Summit '72 is a Canadian documentary television series, which aired in 2022 on CBC Television. The series recounts the history of the 1972 Summit Series hockey competition between Canada and Russia.

It was written and directed by Ravi Baichwal, Dave Bidini, Nicholas de Pencier and Robert MacAskill.

The series received a Canadian Screen Award nomination for Best History Documentary Program or Series at the 11th Canadian Screen Awards in 2023.

Episodes

References

External links

2020s Canadian documentary television series
2020s Canadian sports television series
2022 Canadian television series debuts
CBC Television original programming
Ice hockey television series